Francis Pierre (1931-2013) was a French harpist. He played for the Orchestre de Paris and taught at the Conservatoire de Paris.

References

1931 births
2013 deaths
French harpists